Zoids: The Battle Begins is a 1986 video game designed by Chris Fayers, developed by the Electric Pencil Company, and published by Martech. and released in Europe for the ZX Spectrum, Amstrad CPC, MSX and Commodore 64 computers. Based on the Zoids toy series, the player controls a human who was fused with one of the robots and has to reclaim parts of a larger mech. 

Upon release, Zoids received positive reception from video game critics.

Gameplay

Players control a human who has fused with a machine known as a Spiderzoid; this human has been tasked with reclaiming the six parts of a large machine named Zoidzilla. These parts have been captured by the enemy Red Zoids, each part reclaimed will boost the power of the player's Spiderzoid.

Development
Zoids: The Battle Begins was published by Martech and developed by the Electric Pencil Company, having previously made The Fourth Protocol in 1985. The game was produced by David Martin, with Chris Fayers being the game designer.

Reception

Zoids: The Battle Begins received generally positive reception from video game critics. Reviewers for Amtix praised the game, with one writer considered it to be one of the best on the Amstrad. A writer for Crash gave positive marks for its graphics and gameplay and called it one of the best titles on the ZX Spectrum.

References

External links
 

1986 video games
Amstrad CPC games
Commodore 64 games
MSX games
ZX Spectrum games
Zoids
Video games based on Takara Tomy toys
Video games developed in the United Kingdom
Martech games
Single-player video games